Erythropterus is a genus of beetles in the family Cerambycidae, containing the following species:

 Erythropterus amabilis Melzer, 1934
 Erythropterus boliviensis Clarke, 2007
 Erythropterus cuissi Napp & Monné, 2005
 Erythropterus kochi Clarke, 2007
 Erythropterus urucuri Martins & Galileo, 2004

References

Heteropsini